Ned Palmer is a British cheesemonger and author, and a former jazz pianist. He has worked as an affineur for Neal's Yard Dairy.

In 2019, Palmer's first book was published, A Cheesemonger’s History of the British Isles, and the Times Literary Supplement called him "profoundly knowledgeable about his subject".

In 2021, Palmer's second book was published, A Cheesemonger’s Compendium of British and Irish Cheese.

Publications
A Cheesemonger’s History of the British Isles, Profile, 2019
A Cheesemonger’s Compendium of British and Irish Cheese, Profile, 2021

References

Living people
Cheese retailers
British non-fiction writers
Year of birth missing (living people)